Guido Mainero (born 23 March 1995) is an Argentine professional footballer who plays as a winger for Sarmiento, on loan from Vélez Sarsfield.

Career
Mainero joined Instituto's academy in 2002. He was moved into their first-team for the 2014 Primera B Nacional campaign. He made his professional debut on 5 November 2014 during a win over Boca Unidos, which was the first of thirty-two appearances in his opening three seasons. In his fourth, he netted four goals throughout the year; notably the first against Villa Dálmine in April 2017. In January 2018, Mainero completed a transfer to Argentine Primera División side Vélez Sarsfield. His first appearance in the top-flight came in a 2–0 defeat to Chacarita Juniors on 5 February.

In July 2019, Mainero completed a season-long loan move to Defensa y Justicia. He made twelve appearances in all competitions whilst scoring two goals; in the league versus Talleres and Rosario Central. His 100th career appearance arrived on 3 March 2020 in the Copa Libertadores versus Santos; in what was his last match for Defensa due to the COVID-19 pandemic. He featured for Vélez on 31 October versus Huracán, before departing on loan in November to Chilean team Deportes Iquique. After debuting against Cobresal on 23 November, Mainero scored on 8 December versus Unión Española. After returning from loan in June 2021, he was loaned out once again, this time to Sarmiento until the end of 2022.

Career statistics
.

Notes

References

External links

1995 births
Living people
Footballers from Córdoba, Argentina
Argentine people of Italian descent
Argentine footballers
Association football midfielders
Argentine expatriate footballers
Expatriate footballers in Chile
Argentine expatriate sportspeople in Chile
Primera Nacional players
Argentine Primera División players
Chilean Primera División players
Instituto footballers
Club Atlético Vélez Sarsfield footballers
Defensa y Justicia footballers
Deportes Iquique footballers
Club Atlético Sarmiento footballers